Farncombe railway station opened in 1897 as a minor stop on the Portsmouth Direct Line between Guildford and Godalming, England.  It is said to have been built at the instigation of General Sir Frederick Marshall, a director of the London and South Western Railway Company, who lived nearby at Broadwater.

Location and facilities
The station lies in the centre of Farncombe, a northern suburb of Godalming. Nowadays it is served by South Western Railway on the line from Waterloo to Portsmouth Harbour,  from Waterloo. Farncombe station is staffed most of the time, and has a café on platform 1. There are two full barrier level crossings at Farncombe, one at each end of the station. The two platforms are connected by an old, metal, bridge. The main station buildings, along with the footbridge are Grade II listed.

Services 
All services at Farncombe are operated by South Western Railway using  and  EMUs.

The typical off-peak service in trains per hour is:
 2 tph to  via 

Gallery

References

External links 

Railway stations in Surrey
DfT Category D stations
Former London and South Western Railway stations
Railway stations in Great Britain opened in 1897
Railway stations served by South Western Railway
Grade II listed buildings in Surrey